Monochamus saltuarius is a species of beetle in the family Cerambycidae. It was described by Gebler in 1830. It has a wide distribution throughout Europe.

References

saltuarius
Beetles described in 1830